Yasmin Ladha (born 1958) is an Indian/Tanzanian/Canadian writer.

Life
Yasmin Ladha was born to an Indian Muslim family in Mwanza, Tanganyika. She grew up in Africa, but often visited family members in India. When she was twenty she emigrated to Canada and studied at the University of Calgary, gaining a BA and an MA in English. Her MA thesis, Circum the Gesture, was a collection of eleven creative writing pieces in multiple genres, playing with the notion of immigrant woman as nomad.

Ladha's first collection of stories, Lion's grand-daughter and other stories, was a finalist in the Howard O'Hagan Award for Short Fiction at the 1993 Alberta Literary Awards. The collection explored Indian Diaspora experience, emphasising the female perspective, as well as the relation between writer and reader (addressed familiarly as readerji). A second collection, Women Dancing on Rooftops, was published in 1997, when Ladha was living in Chonbuk in South Korea. Ladha has also taught at the Alberta College of Art and Design and worked in Muscat, Oman.

In 1995, Ladha was the Guest Editor for Rungh Magazine's "Food Issue", Volume 3, No. 1. She was featured in a conversation titled, "Home - Waffling with Cunning in the Border Country" in Rungh Magazine's first issue, Volume 1, No. 1 and 2, with Ramabai Espinet, and Sherazad Jamal.  Ladha also reviewed the film Mississippi Masala for Rungh Magazine's "Film and Video Issue", Volume 1, Number 3. 

Ladha's 2010 novel Blue Sunflower Startle presents the city of Calgary, through the imagination of an immigrant woman, as a lover who is actively seeking the protagonist.

Works
 Lion's granddaughter and other stories. Edmonton: NeWest Press, 1992.
 Bridal Hands on the Maple. Calgary: Second Wednesday Press, 1992.
 Women dancing on rooftops: bring your belly close by. Toronto: TSAR, 1997.
 Blue sunflower startle: a novel. Calgary: Freehand Books, 2010.
 (with Sukita). Country Drive. India: Red River Press, 2017. Illustrated by Anandana Kapur.

References

Tanzanian novelists
Tanzanian women writers
Indian women writers
Canadian women short story writers
1958 births
Living people
University of Calgary alumni
Tanzanian emigrants to Canada
Tanzanian people of Indian descent
Canadian people of Indian descent
Canadian women novelists
21st-century Canadian novelists
21st-century Canadian short story writers
21st-century Canadian women writers